Planet of the Apemen: Battle for Earth is a dramatised documentary on the struggles of Homo sapiens with Homo erectus in the first episode, and Homo neanderthalensis in the second episode, broadcast on BBC One on 23 and 30 June 2011 respectively.

Plot
Planet of the Apemen: Battle for Earth is a dramatised documentary on how Homo sapiens once shared the world with other species of hominid. The first episode concentrates on Homo erectus, set in India around 75,000 years ago, life after a catastrophic super-volcanic eruption made food animals scarce and Homo erectus encounters a different species of human. 

The second episode focuses on the plight of  the Homo neanderthalensis. The scene is set in Prehistoric France some 35,000 years ago, where migrating Homo sapiens looking for food animals, chance upon a community of Neanderthals.
This series was first broadcast on BBC One on 23 and 30 June 2011 respectively.

Cast
Narrator for both episodes - Geraldine James

Episode 1 Homo erectus 
Homo sapiens
Jothan Annan as Gamba  
Roger Nsengiyumva as Baako 
Ranya Campbell as Malika 
Angela Wynter as Wangari 

Homo erectus
Clayton Evertson as Mika
Sang Lui as Heku 
Nathan Fredricks as Kiko 
Ryan Knoll as Dokka

Episode 2 Neanderthal 
Homo neanderthalensis 
Justin Strydom as Gora 
Ethan Strydom as Gora's son 
Matt Rook as Tetah 
Lee-Anne Liebenberg as Tetah's Mate 
Troy Milenov as the Neanderthal Man - 
Rika Haasbroek as the Neanderthal Woman 
Johnny Everitt as the Old Neanderthal 

Homo sapiens
Rebecca Scroggs as Byana 
Ray Fearon as Kalay 
Gary Carr as Jala 
Jimmy Akingbola as Morda 
Ngobile Sipama as Sapiens Woman 

Guest actors
Sean Francis as Geron 
Damian Tomaselli as Radda

References

External links
 
Episode 1 Homo erectus
Episode 2 Neanderthal

2011 British television series debuts
2011 British television series endings
2010s British drama television series
BBC television documentaries
2010s British television miniseries
English-language television shows
Documentary films about prehistoric life
Documentary television shows about evolution
Films directed by Tony Mitchell